Yekəxana or Yekaxana or Yekya-Khana or Yekakhana or Yekekhana may refer to:
Yekəxana, Gobustan, Azerbaijan
Yekəxana, Goychay, Azerbaijan